Avdelan-e Olya (also Romanized as Āvdelān-e ‘Olyā) is a village in Beradust Rural District, Sumay-ye Beradust District, Urmia County, West Azerbaijan Province, Iran. At the 2006 census, its population was 13, in 4 families.

References 

Populated places in Urmia County